Belfi is a surname of Italian origin. Notable people with the surname include:

Andrea Belfi (born 1979), Italian electro-acoustic musician and composer
Donald E. Belfi (1936–2020), American lawyer, judge, and politician 
Jordan Belfi (born 1978), American actor

References

Surnames of Italian origin